Sabinal may refer to:
 Cayo Sabinal, island in Cuba
 Rio Sabinal Group, a geologic group in Mexico
 Sabinal, Texas